The discography of American country artist Gail Davies consists of ten studio albums, three compilations, one live album, and twenty-five singles. In 1974, she recorded and released one single with A&M Records before signing with Lifesong Records in 1978. Her self-titled debut album was released in November 1978, spawning three singles. The album's first single, a cover Webb Pierce's "No Love Have I", peaked at number twenty six on the Billboard Hot Country Singles chart. It was the third single entitled "Someone Is Looking for Someone Like You" that became Davies' first major hit, reaching the top fifteen on the Billboard country chart in 1979. Dissatisfied with her first album's production techniques, Davies produced her second studio album, The Game. With the album's released in 1980, Davies became the first female country artist to produce her own recordings entirely by herself. "Blue Heartache" was the project's lead single, becoming her first top-ten hit in 1980.

I'll Be There (1981) was her third studio album and became the most commercially successful, peaking at number twenty-seven on the Billboard Top Country Albums chart. Spawning three singles, "I'll Be There (If You Ever Want Me)", "It's a Lovely, Lovely World", and "Grandma's Song", became top-ten hits on the Hot Country Singles chart. Her next studio album Givin' Herself Away was issued in February 1982. It included the top-ten single, "Round the Clock Lovin'" and a cover of Marty Robbins' "Singing the Blues", which reached the country top twenty. What Can I Say (1983) was her fifth studio release and final recording for Warner Bros. Records, reaching number forty-eight on the country albums chart in 1983. Signing with RCA Nashville in 1984, Where Is a Woman to Go was released on the label that November, reaching a peak of number fifty-seven. The album spawned a total of four singles, including the major hits "Jagged Edge of a Broken Heart" and "Break Away". Pretty Words was issued in 1989 on MCA Records, spawning two minor Billboard country singles. While becoming a staff producer for Capitol Nashville in 1990, Davies released her next studio album, The Other Side of Love, through the same label. In the 1990s, she formed her own record label entitled Little Chickadee, releasing two studio albums on the company: Eclectic (1995) and Love Ain't Easy (1998). Her 2005 compilation release The Songwriter Sessions compiled forty-five original tracks recorded by Davies throughout her career and is her most recent album release.

Albums

Studio albums

Live albums

Compilation albums

Singles

Appearances on other artist's albums

Music videos

References

Country music discographies
Discographies of American artists